{{DISPLAYTITLE:C12H24O}}
The molecular formula C12H24O (molar mass: 184.32 g/mol, exact mass: 184.1827 u) may refer to:

 Dodecanal, or dodecyl aldehyde
 2-Methylundecanal

Molecular formulas